Jett Howard (born September 14, 2003) is an American college basketball player for the Michigan Wolverines of the Big Ten Conference. He is the son of former NCAA All-American, NBA All-Star and NBA Champion Juwan Howard (his coach at Michigan) and has three older brothers who play or played NCAA Division I college basketball.

In high school, he won a Florida High School Athletic Association (FHSSA) Class 5A State championship as a freshman at NSU University School. As a junior he transferred to IMG Academy, where the team made back to back runs to the high school national final four. He was both a Jordan Brand Classic and a Iverson Roundball Classic honoree/participant.

High school career
Howard attended NSU University School for his freshman and sophomore seasons from 2018 to 2020, before transferring to IMG Academy for his junior and senior seasons from 2020 to 2022. His brother Jace played his junior and senior seasons with him for NSU University from 2018 to 2020. The 2018–19 University team, which included Vernon Carey Jr., Scottie Barnes and Taylor Hendricks as well as the Howard brothers, successfully defended its FHSSA Class 5A State championship with a victory over Andrew Jackson High School, despite Carey being sidelined for the championship game. Howard participated in 3 USA Basketball Junior National Team minicamps as well as a USA U16 National Team training camp in 2018 and 2019.

At IMG, Howard and teammates Jaden Bradley and Michigan Wolverine commit Moussa Diabate went to the 2021 Geico National Semifinals where they lost to Sunrise Christian Academy. Despite the loss Paul Biancardi of ESPN described Howard as "best shooter on the floor". With teammates Keyonte George and Jarace Walker, Howard and IMG lost the 2022 National semifinals to the Dariq Whitehead-led Montverde Academy. 

Howard participated in the April 2022 Jordan Brand Classic despite being the 37th ranked player and 11th ranked player at his position in the National class of 2022. By May 2022, Howard had slipped to the 40th slot in the National Class of 2022, but he excelled as the MVP of the Allen Iverson Roundball Classic despite the participation of 7 top-20 players (George, Cason Wallace, Kel'el Ware, Walker, Brandon Miller, Arterio Morris and Anthony Black) on a 20-point 9-for-12 shooting performance. Iverson and J.R. Smith were among those who were impressed by Howard.

Recruitment
Despite having a major college basketball head coach for a father, he pushed for a normal recruiting process. Howard had several offers from major conference schools, including 4 SEC schools (Florida, Tennessee , Vanderbilt, and LSU) as well as Michigan, Georgetown and NC State. Howard visited Tennessee in September 2021 and almost committed to them. His inner circle for his decision making included his mother and aunt, who accompanied him on school visits, unlike his father who was competing for his commitment. On October 13, 2021, Howard committed to play for his father and with his brother Jace for the Michigan Wolverines men's basketball team. On November 13, 2021, Howard and other members of Michigan's class of 2022 (Gregg Glenn, Dug McDaniel and Tarris Reed Jr.) signed their National Letters of Intent.

College career

Howard played his freshman season for the 2022–23 Michigan Wolverines. Michigan began the season on November 7, 2022, with a 75–56 victory over Purdue Fort Wayne. Howard contributed 21 points in his debut, becoming the first Wolverine to debut with 20+ points since Jamal Crawford posted 21, on November 19, 1999. In his first week of play, he earned Big Ten Freshman of the Week recognition for the week ending November 13, 2022. By early January, he was being mentioned as a future 2023 NBA draft lottery pick. Howard posted a season-high 34 points on January 12, 2023, against Iowa, including Michigan's first 11 points and his first 5 three point shots. Following the regular season, he earned All-Big Ten 3rd team recognition from the media and honorable mention recognition from the coaches as well as All-Freshman recognition from the coaches, marking the fifth consecutive season that Michigan has had an All-Freshman honoree (Moussa Diabaté, Hunter Dickinson, Franz Wagner and Ignas Brazdeikis).

Personal life
Howard was born in Chicago on September 14, 2003, to Jenine and Juwan Howard. His father had a 25-year career in the National Basketball Association (NBA) before becoming the Michigan Wolverines basketball head coach at his alma mater. He was an NCAA All-American as well as NBA All-Star and champion. His half-brother, Juwan Howard, Jr. (son of Juwan Howard and MHSAA basketball champion Markita Blyden), was a 2-time All-Horizon League 2nd team selection for the Detroit Titans in 2014 and 2015. His other half-brother, Josh Howard (son of Juwan Howard and Tabatha Johnson), played four years (2016–20) for the Brown Bears. His brother Jace played at Michigan with him.

See also
 Michigan Wolverines men's basketball statistical leaders

References

External links
 Michigan Wolverines bio
 stats at ESPN

2003 births
Living people
21st-century African-American sportspeople
African-American basketball players
American men's basketball players
Basketball players from Chicago
Basketball players from Florida
IMG Academy alumni
Michigan Wolverines men's basketball players
NSU University School alumni
Small forwards